The Quinnipiac Bobcats program represented Quinnipiac University during the 2014-15 NCAA Division I women's ice hockey season. Their 26 wins were the fifth most in the nation, and they remained nationally ranked throughout the season.  Their success earned them a berth in the NCAA Tournament, but they were defeated by their ECAC rivals, Harvard, in the first round.

Offseason
 The Bobcats travelled to Itay and Switzerland for ten days in August for exhibition games against European teams.

Recruiting

2014–15 Bobcats

Schedule

|-
!colspan=12 style=""| Regular Season

|-
!colspan=12 style=""| ECAC Tournament

|-
!colspan=12 style=""| NCAA Tournament

Awards and honors
ECAC Team Sportsmanship Award
Chelsea Laden, Mandi Schwartz ECAC Student Athlete of the Year
Chelsea Laden, G, All-ECAC Second Team
Nicole Kosta, F, All-ECAC Third Team
Taylar Cianfarano, F, All ECAC Rookie Team
Chelsea Laden was fourth nationally in Goals Against Average (1.19)

References

Quinnipiac
Quinnipiac Bobcats women's ice hockey seasons
Quinnipiac